Washington Theological Union (WTU) was a Catholic graduate school of theology and seminary in Washington, D.C. in the United States, founded in 1968. It stopped accepting students in 2011, and suspended operations at the end of June 2015. 

WTU was accredited by the Association of Theological Schools in the United States and Canada (ATS), the Middle States Commission on Higher Education and was a member of the Washington Theological Consortium.

History 
Founded through a partnership among Catholic religious orders and congregations in the wake of the Second Vatican Council, the Master of Arts (MA) in Theology was first awarded to 10 religious order men in 1972 and was the more challenging masters level academic degree. The Master of Divinity (M.Div.) degree was first handed out in 1975 to four religious order men. 

Eventually, the school opened to people from other religions in the United States and many foreign countries.

In 1977, the first religious order woman received a Master of Arts degree in Theology and in 1980, the first laywoman received the Master of Divinity degree, followed in 1985 by the first layman to receive a Master of Arts in Theology degree. As a capstone, the Doctor of Ministry (D.Min.) degree in Christian Spirituality was given in 2011, followed by several other religious men and women, priests and laymen and women; the last being awarded in May 2015.

The many graduates from WTU serve in a variety of ecclesial positions including chaplains, academic officials and clergy.

The school closed in 2015 because of financial difficulties, low enrollment, and declining vocations. Student records and archival history were transferred to Saint Bonaventure University in New York in 2015 after operations were wound down. Student records are administered by the Registrar's Office and other official historical information is administered by that university's Friedsam Library.

Over 4,500 students attended Washington Theological Union, with almost 500 of them completing a certificate during their sabbatical.

References

External links
St Bonaventure University Registrar website

Defunct private universities and colleges in Washington, D.C.
Defunct Catholic universities and colleges in the United States
Educational institutions established in 1968
Roman Catholic Archdiocese of Washington
Catholic universities and colleges in Washington, D.C.
Takoma (Washington, D.C.)